A Time to Kill is a 1955 British crime film directed by Charles Saunders and starring Jack Watling, Rona Anderson, John Horsley, Russell Napier, Kenneth Kent, and John Le Mesurier.

Cast
 Jack Watling as Dennis Willows
 Rona Anderson as Sallie Harbord
 John Horsley as Peter Hastings
 Russell Napier as Inspector Simmons
 Kenneth Kent as Dr. Cole
 Mary Jones as Florence Cole
 Alastair Hunter as Sergeant Thorpe
 Joan Hickson as Miss Edinger
 John Le Mesurier as Phineas Tilliard

External links

1955 films
1955 crime films
British crime films
Films about lawyers
1950s English-language films
1950s British films
British black-and-white films